Episynlestes intermedius is a species of Australian damselfly in the family Synlestidae,
commonly known as an intermediate whitetip. 
It is endemic to the Eungella area of Queensland, where it inhabits streams.

Episynlestes intermedius is a large, very slender damselfly, coloured a dull bronze-black with white markings. It often perches with its wings outspread.

Gallery

See also
 List of Odonata species of Australia

References 

Synlestidae
Odonata of Australia
Insects of Australia
Endemic fauna of Australia
Taxa named by Günther Theischinger
Taxa named by J.A.L. (Tony) Watson
Insects described in 1985
Damselflies